Lester Henry Rock (born Lester Henry Schwarzrock; August 19, 1912 – September 9, 1991) was a first baseman in Major League Baseball. He played for the Chicago White Sox in 1936.

References

External links

1912 births
1991 deaths
Major League Baseball first basemen
Chicago White Sox players
Baseball players from Minnesota
People from Springfield, Minnesota
Williamston Martins players
Norfolk Elks players